Aspidodiadema hawaiiense is a species of sea urchin of the family Aspidodiadematidae. Their armor is covered with spines. It is placed in the genus Aspidodiadema and lives in the sea. Aspidodiadema hawaiiense was first scientifically described in 1939 by Ole Theodor Jensen Mortensen, a Danish scientist.

References 

hawaiiense
Animals described in 1939
Taxa named by Ole Theodor Jensen Mortensen